Bebop Revisited!, is the debut album led by  American jazz alto saxophonist Charles McPherson recorded in 1964 and released on the Prestige label.

Reception

Allmusic awarded the album 4½ stars with its review by Scott Yanow stating, "McPherson and Jones make for a potent frontline on these spirited performances, easily recommended to fans of straightahead jazz".

Track listing 
 "Hot House"  (Tadd Dameron) – 7:43  
 "Nostalgia" (Fats Navarro) – 5:24  
 "Variations on a Blues by Bird"  (Charlie Parker) – 6:55  
 "Wail" (Bud Powell) – 6:04  
 "Embraceable You" (George Gershwin, Ira Gershwin) – 7:39  
 "Si Si" (Parker) – 5:50  
 "If I Loved You" (Oscar Hammerstein II, Richard Rodgers) – 6:17 Bonus track on CD reissue

Personnel 
Charles McPherson – alto saxophone
Carmell Jones – trumpet
Barry Harris – piano
Nelson Boyd – bass
Albert Heath – drums

References 

Charles McPherson (musician) albums
1964 albums
Prestige Records albums
Albums produced by Don Schlitten
Albums recorded at Van Gelder Studio